A trailblazer is a person who is paving the way in their particular field for future generations.

Trailblazer may refer to:

Sports
 Derby Trailblazers, a British semi-professional basketball team
 North Carolina Trailblazers, a US women's recreational ice hockey association 
 Portland Trail Blazers, a basketball team based in Portland, Oregon
 Southampton Trailblazers, a British basketball club

Transportation and travel
 The Chevrolet TrailBlazer, a sport utility vehicle made by General Motors
 Trailblazer (travel), an independent British publisher of travel, trekking, and railway route guides
 Trailblazer Travel Books, a US series of guidebooks focusing on Hawaii
 Trail Blazer (passenger train), a Pennsylvania Railroad train, which ran from Chicago to New York, via Pittsburgh
 Toyota Trekker, another name for the Toyota Trailblazer
 A highway shield and route marker roadside sign assembly
 Trailblazer (monorail), which was a suspended monorail that operated at Fair Park in Dallas, Texas from 1956 to 1964

Technology and computing
 Trailblazer Project, a NSA programme to track communication methods such as cell phones and email
 Trailblazer (satellite), a technology demonstration satellite, which was to have been operated by the US Air Force and MDA
 Trailblazer (video game), a 1986 video game by Gremlin Graphics, later updated for the Gizmondo
 Cosmic Causeway: Trailblazer II, its sequel
 Trailblazers (video game), 2018 video game
 Trailblazer-class cruiser starship in Lightspeed (video game)
 The Telebit TrailBlazer, a 1980s–1990s high speed modem
 The codename of Borland's InterBase database version 2007

Media
 Trailblazer (album), a 1990 live album by punk band ALL
 Trail Blazer (album), an album by the Turkish heavy metal band Mezarkabul
 Trailblazers (TV series), a 2007 British television program broadcast on XLEAGUE.TV
 NAACP Theatre Award – Trailblazer Award, an award presented to an individual who has made their mark in the entertainment industry
 Trail Blazer Award (MMVA Award), a defunct MMVA award
 Daniel Boone, Trail Blazer, a 1956 American film
 Albert Pendarvis, more commonly known as The Old Trailblazer, a Christian broadcaster
 The Trail Blazers (film series) a 1940 series of B Westerns made by Monogram Pictures
 Trail Blazers (film), a 1953 American film directed by Wesley Barry
"Trailblazer", Nora En Pure discography

Other uses
 Trailblazer (board game), a 1981 science fiction game
 Trailblazer (roller coaster), a rollercoaster at Hersheypark, USA
 Trailblazer Pipeline, a natural gas pipeline that brings natural gas from Colorado into Nebraska
 Operation Trailblazer, a coalition military operation in the Iraq War

See also
 Blazer (disambiguation), a common truncation of Trailblazer